Lewisburg Avenue Historic District is a  historic district in Franklin, Tennessee that was listed on the National Register of Historic Places in 1988 .

It includes Late 19th and 20th Century Revivals, Bungalow/Craftsman, and Late Victorian architecture.

When listed, the district included 34 contributing buildings and three contributing structures.  Also included were six non-contributing buildings, one non-contributing structure,.

The property was covered in a 1988 study of Williamson County historical resources.

References

Historic districts in Williamson County, Tennessee
American Craftsman architecture in Tennessee
Bungalow architecture in Tennessee
Historic districts on the National Register of Historic Places in Tennessee
Franklin, Tennessee
National Register of Historic Places in Williamson County, Tennessee